Frederick Arnold may refer to:
Frederick Arnold (rower) (1823–1898), English rower
Lance-Bombardier Frederick Arnold (1890–1916), Canadian soldier
Frederick Arnold (cricketer) (1899–1980), English cricketer and British Army officer
Freddy Arnold, character in Streamline Express

See also
Frederick Arnold-Baker (1885–1963), British lawyer